The 2016–17 Miami Heat season was the 29th season of the franchise in the National Basketball Association (NBA).

After a tumultuous negotiation process, Dwyane Wade decided to leave the Heat and sign with his hometown Chicago Bulls in the offseason. This was the first season without Wade since 2002-03. Although the Heat would re-acquire Wade via a trade with the Cleveland Cavaliers a season later, his departure made Udonis Haslem the new longest tenured player on the roster, as Haslem first joined the Heat in August 2003, a month after Wade did. Furthermore, Chris Bosh missed the entire season and had thought about potentially retiring altogether due to his continuous blood clots. Bosh had not played since February 9, 2016. It was the NBA's first full season without Bosh since 2002-03, and the Heat's first since 2009-10. After spending the next 2 seasons as a free agent, Bosh would later announce his retirement from the NBA on February 12, 2019.

The team got off to an 11–30 start. However, the Heat rallied to go 30–11 down the stretch, only to be eliminated after the last game of the season. They entered game 82 needing a loss from either the Pacers or the Bulls and a victory over the Wizards. However, despite a 110–102 win over the Washington Wizards, both the Pacers and the Bulls won their games. The Heat finished tied with the Chicago Bulls with identical 41–41 records but the Bulls won the head-to-head tie breaker against the Heat 2–1. As a result, the Heat missed the playoffs for the second time in three years.

Hassan Whiteside earned praise for being the NBA's leading rebounder after ending his previous season as the leading shot blocker in the NBA.

Draft picks

The Heat did not have a pick in the 2016 NBA Draft.

Roster

Standings

Division

Conference

Game log

Preseason

|- style="background:#cfc
| 1
| October 4
| @ Wizards
| 
| Hassan Whiteside (20)
| Hassan Whiteside (13)
| Dion Waiters (8)
| Verizon Center9,100
| 1–0
|- style="background:#fcc
| 2
| October 8
| Timberwolves
| 
| Hassan Whiteside (17)
| Hassan Whiteside (12)
| Dion Waiters (6)
| Sprint Center13,042
| 1–1
|- style="background:#cfc
| 3
| October 11
| Nets
| 
| Hassan Whiteside (21)
| Hassan Whiteside (14)
| Goran Dragic (11)
| American Airlines Arena19,600
| 2–1
|- style="background:#cfc
| 4
| October 14
| @ Spurs
| 
| Tyler Johnson (17)
| Hassan Whiteside (9)
| Goran Dragic (6)
| AT&T Center18,418
| 3–1
|- style="background:#fcc
| 5
| October 15
| Timberwolves
| 
| Rodney McGruder (15)
| Willie Reed (13)
| Brianté Weber (6)
| KFC Yum! Center9,672
| 3–2
|- style="background:#cfc;"
| 6
| October 18
| Magic
| 
| Goran Dragic (17)
| Willie Reed (11)
| Goran Dragic (5)
| American Airlines Arena19,600
| 4–2
|- style="background:#fcc;"
| 7
| October 20
| @ Hornets
| 
| Rodney McGruder (19)
| Okaro White (12)
| Brianté Weber (7)
| Spectrum Center9,127
| 4–3
|- style="background:#fcc;"
| 8
| October 21
| 76ers
| 
| Goran Dragic (17)
| Hassan Whiteside (8)
| Goran Dragic (7)
| American Airlines Arena19,600
| 4–4

Regular season

|- style="background:#bfb"
| 1
| October 26
| @ Orlando
| 
| Hassan Whiteside (18)
| Hassan Whiteside (14)
| Goran Dragic (6)
| Amway Center19,298
| 1–0
|- style="background:#fbb"
| 2
| October 28
| Charlotte
| 
| Hassan Whiteside (20)
| Hassan Whiteside (15)
| Goran Dragic (9)
| American Airlines Arena4,538
| 1–1
|- style="background:#fbb"
| 3
| October 30
| San Antonio
| 
| Hassan Whiteside (27)
| Hassan Whiteside (15)
| Goran Dragic (5)
| American Airlines Arena4,567
| 1–2

|- style="background:#bfb"
| 4
| November 1
| Sacramento
| 
| Goran Dragic (25)
| Hassan Whiteside (11)
| Goran Dragic (8)
| American Airlines Arena19,612
| 2–2
|- style="background:#fbb;"
| 5
| November 4
| @ Toronto
| 
| Hassan Whiteside (21)
| Hassan Whiteside (11)
| Goran Dragic (8)
| Air Canada Centre19,800
| 2–3
|- style="background:#fbb;"
| 6
| November 7
| @ Oklahoma City
| 
| James Johnson (18)
| Hassan Whiteside (10)
| Waiters, Dragic (4)
| Chesapeake Energy Arena 18,203
| 2–4
|- style="background:#fbb"
| 7
| November 10
| Chicago
| 
| Hassan Whiteside (20)
| Hassan Whiteside (20)
| Waiters, Winslow (6)
| American Airlines Arena19,600
| 2–5
|- style="background:#fbb"
| 8
| November 12
| Utah
| 
| Whiteside, J. Johnson (15)
| Hassan Whiteside (14)
| J. Johnson, Richardson, T. Johnson (4)
| American Airlines Arena19,600
| 2–6
|- style="background:#fbb"
| 9
| November 14
| @ San Antonio
| 
| Dion Waiters (27)
| Hassan Whiteside (17)
| Tyler Johnson (6)
| AT&T Center18,418
| 2–7
|- style="background:#fbb"
| 10
| November 15
| Atlanta
| 
| Whiteside, Richardson (19)
| Hassan Whiteside (25)
| Rodney McGruder (3)
| American Airlines Arena19,600
| 2–8
|- style="background:#bfb"
| 11
| November 17
| Milwaukee
| 
| Dion Waiters (23)
| Hassan Whiteside (17)
| Tyler Johnson (5)
| American Airlines Arena19,600
| 3–8
|- style="background:#bfb"
| 12
| November 19
| @ Washington
| 
| Goran Dragic (22)
| Hassan Whiteside (18)
| Dion Waiters (8)
| Verizon Center15,848
| 4–8
|- style="background:#fbb"
| 13
| November 21
| @ Philadelphia
| 
| Hassan Whiteside (32)
| Hassan Whiteside (13)
| Goran Dragic (7)
| Wells Fargo Center16,477
| 4–9
|- style="background:#fbb"
| 14
| November 23
| @ Detroit
| 
| Tyler Johnson (17)
| Hassan Whiteside (8)
| Tyler Johnson (7)
| Palace of Auburn Hills14,520
| 4–10
|- style="background:#bfb"
| 15
| November 25
| @ Memphis
| 
| Tyler Johnson (22)
| Hassan Whiteside (12)
| Waiters, Richardson (4)
| FedExForum17,222
| 5–10
|- style="background:#fbb"
| 16
| November 26
| Memphis
| 
| Dion Waiters (25)
| Hassan Whiteside (12)
| Dion Waiters (6)
| American Airlines Arena19,600
| 5–11
|- style="background:#fbb"
| 17
| November 28
| Boston
| 
| Goran Dragic (27)
| Hassan Whiteside (16)
| Goran Dragic (17)
| American Airlines Arena19,600
| 5–12
|- style="background:#bfb"
| 18
| November 30
| @ Denver
| 
| Hassan Whiteside (25)
| Hassan Whiteside (16)
| Dragic, T. Johnson (7)
| Pepsi Center11,471
| 6–12

|-style="background:#bfb"
| 19
| December 1
| @ Utah
| 
| Goran Dragic (27)
| Hassan Whiteside (10)
| Goran Dragic (6)
| Vivint Smart Home Arena19,073
| 7–12
|- style="background:#fbb;"
| 20
| December 3
| @ Portland
| 
| Goran Dragic (28)
| Hassan Whiteside (16)
| Goran Dragic (8)
| Moda Center19,393
| 7–13
|- style="background:#fbb"
| 21
| December 6
| New York
| 
| Goran Dragic (29)
| Hassan Whiteside (14)
| Goran Dragic (7)
| American Airlines Arena19,610
| 7–14
|- style="background:#fbb;"
| 22
| December 7
| @ Atlanta
| 
| Tyler Johnson (27)
| Hassan Whiteside (12)
| McGruder, T. Johnson  (5)
| Philips Arena11,326
| 7–15
|- style= "background:#fbb;"
| 23
| December 9
| @ Cleveland
| 
| Derrick Williams (17)
| Hassan Whiteside (12)
| McGruder, Dragic, McRoberts (4)
| Quicken Loans Arena 20,562
| 7–16
|- style="background:#fbb"
| 24
| December 10
| @ Chicago
| 
| Goran Dragic (21)
| Williams, Whiteside (8)
| Goran Dragic (7)
| United Center21,450
| 7–17
|- style="background:#bfb"
| 25
| December 12
| Washington
| 
| Goran Dragic (34)
| Hassan Whiteside (16)
| Dragic, Ellington (5)
| American Airlines Arena19,600
| 8–17
|- style="background:#bfb"
| 26
| December 14
| Indiana
| 
| Hassan Whiteside (26)
| Hassan Whiteside (22)
| Goran Dragic (7)
| American Airlines Arena19,600
| 9–17
|- style="background:#fbb"
| 27
| December 16
| LA Clippers
| 
| Goran Dragic (21)
| Hassan Whiteside (17)
| Goran Dragic (11)
| American Airlines Arena19,600
| 9–18
|- style="background:#fbb"
| 28
| December 18
| Boston
| 
| Goran Dragic (31)
| Hassan Whiteside (17)
| Goran Dragic (7)
| American Airlines Arena19,600
| 9–19
|- style="background:#fbb;"
| 29
| December 20
| Orlando
| 
| T. Johnson, Whiteside (32)
| Hassan Whiteside (15)
| J. Johnson, Richardson (6)
| American Airlines Arena19,600
| 9–20
|- style="background:#bfb;"
| 30
| December 22
| L. A. Lakers
| 
| Whiteside, Winslow (23)
| Whiteside, Winslow (13)
| Goran Dragic (7)
| American Airlines Arena19,712
| 10–20
|- style="background:#fbb;"
| 31
| December 23
| @ New Orleans
| 
| Goran Dragic (23)
| Hassan Whiteside (18)
| Goran Dragic (5)
| Smoothie King Center16,322
| 10–21
|- style="background:#fbb;"
| 32
| December 27
| Oklahoma City
| 
| Josh Richardson (22)
| Hassan Whiteside (8)
| Justise Winslow (5)
| American Airlines Arena19,977
| 10–22
|- style="background:#fbb;"
| 33
| December 29
| @ Charlotte
| 
| Josh Richardson (20)
| Hassan Whiteside (10)
| Goran Dragic (8)
| Spectrum Center19,471
| 10–23
|- style= "background:#fbb;"
| 34
| December 30
| @ Boston
| 
| James Johnson (22)
| Justise Winslow (9)
| Josh Richardson (8)
| TD Garden 18,624
| 10–24

|- style="background:#fbb"
| 35
| January 1
| Detroit
| 
| James Johnson (20)
| James Johnson (7)
| Josh Richardson (8)
| American Airlines Arena19,844
| 10–25
|- style="background:#fbb"
| 36
| January 3
| @ Phoenix
| 
| Goran Dragic (24)
| Hassan Whiteside (18)
| Goran Dragic (9)
| Talking Stick Resort Arena16,772
| 10–26
|- style="background:#bfb"
| 37
| January 4
| @ Sacramento
| 
| Tyler Johnson (23)
| Josh Richardson (8)
| Goran Dragic (7)
| Golden 1 Center17,608
| 11–26
|- style="background:#fbb"
| 38
| January 6
| @ L. A. Lakers
| 
| Willie Reed (22)
| Willie Reed (12)
| Goran Dragic (3)
| Staples Center18,997
| 11–27
|- style="background:#fbb"
| 39
| January 8
| @ L. A. Clippers
| 
| Goran Dragic (24)
| Hassan Whiteside (13)
| Goran Dragic (5)
| Staples Center19,060
| 11–28
|- style="background:#fbb"
| 40
| January 10
| @ Golden State
| 
| Hassan Whiteside (28)
| Hassan Whiteside (20)
| Dion Waiters (8)
| Oracle Arena19,596
| 11−29
|- style="background:#fbb;"
| 41
| January 13
| @ Milwaukee
| 
| Dragic, Whiteside (19)
| Hassan Whiteside (9)
| Dion Waiters (6)
| BMO Harris Bradley Center17,483
| 11–30
|- style="background:#bfb;"
| 42
| January 17
| Houston
| 
| Goran Dragic (21)
| Hassan Whiteside (15)
| Goran Dragic (8)
| American Airlines Arena19,600
| 12–30
|- style="background:#bfb;"
| 43
| January 19
| Dallas
| 
| Goran Dragic (30)
| J. Johnson, Whiteside (8)
| James Johnson (4)
| American Airlines Arena19,600
| 13–30
|- style="background:#bfb;"
| 44
| January 21
| Milwaukee
| 
| Dion Waiters (33)
| Hassan Whiteside (15)
| J. Johnson, Dragic (6)
| American Airlines Arena19,600
| 14–30
|- style="background:#bfb;"
| 45
| January 23
| Golden State
| 
| Dion Waiters (33)
| Hassan Whiteside (15)
| Goran Dragic (5)
| American Airlines Arena19,600
| 15–30
|-style="background:#bfb;"
| 46
| January 25
| @ Brooklyn
| 
| Dion Waiters (24)
| Goran Dragic (9)
| Goran Dragic (9)
| Barclays Center14,929
| 16–30
|- style="background:#bfb;"
| 47
| January 27
| @ Chicago
| 
| Goran Dragic (26)
| James Johnson (9)
| Goran Dragic (11)
| United Center22,082
| 17–30
|- style="background:#bfb;"
| 48
| January 28
| Detroit
| 
| Goran Dragic (23)
| Hassan Whiteside (12)
| Dion Waiters (7)
| American Airlines Arena19,600
| 18–30
|- style="background:#bfb;"
| 49
| January 30
| Brooklyn
| 
| Goran Dragic (20)
| Hassan Whiteside (9)
| Dion Waiters (9)
| American Airlines Arena19,600
| 19–30

|- style="background:#bfb;"
| 50
| February 1
| Atlanta
| 
| Goran Dragic (27)
| Hassan Whiteside (18)
| Goran Dragic (5)
| AmericanAirlines Arena19,600
| 20–30
|- style="background:#bfb;"
| 51
| February 4
| Philadelphia
| 
| Hassan Whiteside (30)
| Hassan Whiteside (20)
| Goran Dragic (8)
| AmericanAirlines Arena19,754
| 21–30
|- style="background:#bfb;"
| 52
| February 6
| @ Minnesota
| 
| Goran Dragic (33)
| Hassan Whiteside (13)
| Goran Dragic (9)
| Target Center12,502
| 22–30
|- style="background:#bfb;"
| 53
| February 8
| @ Milwaukee
| 
| Hassan Whiteside (23)
| Hassan Whiteside (16)
| Goran Dragic (7)
| Bradley Center14,211
| 23–30
|- style="background:#bfb;"
| 54
| February 10
| @ Brooklyn
| 
| Goran Dragic (21)
| Hassan Whiteside (9)
| Goran Dragic (5)
| Barclays Center15,382
| 24–30
|- style="background:#fbb;"
| 55
| February 11
| @ Philadelphia
| 
| Goran Dragic (30)
| Hassan Whiteside (19)
| Tyler Johnson (5)
| Wells Fargo Center20,698
| 24–31
|- style="background:#fbb;"
| 56
| February 13
| Orlando
| 
| Dion Waiters (23)
| Hassan Whiteside (19)
| Dion Waiters (6)
| AmericanAirlines Arena19,600
| 24–32
|- style="background:#bfb;"
| 57
| February 15
| @ Houston
| 
| Whiteside, Waiters (23)
| Hassan Whiteside (14)
| Dion Waiters (7)
| Toyota Center 16,967
| 25–32
|- style="background:#bfb;"
| 58
| February 24
| @ Atlanta
| 
| Tyler Johnson (23)
| Hassan Whiteside (10)
| Dion Waiters (10)
| Philips Arena18,122
| 26–32
|- style="background:#bfb;"
| 59
| February 25
| Indiana
| 
| Whiteside, Waiters (22)
| Hassan Whiteside (17)
| James Johnson (8)
| AmericanAirlines Arena19,600
| 27–32
|-style="background:#fbb;"
| 60
| February 27
| @ Dallas
| 
| Goran Dragic (24)
| Hassan Whiteside (19)
| Dragic, Waiters (6)
| American Airlines Center19,539
| 27–33

|-style="background:#bfb;"
| 61
| March 1
| Philadelphia
| 
| Tyler Johnson (24)
| Hassan Whiteside (11)
| Josh Richardson (5)
| American Airlines Center19,609
| 28–33
|-style="background:#fbb;"
| 62
| March 3
| @ Orlando
| 
| James Johnson (19)
| Hassan Whiteside (18)
| James Johnson (6)
| Amway Center17,136
| 28–34
|- style= "background:#bfb;"
| 63
| March 4
| Cleveland
| 
| Goran Dragic (23)
| Hassan Whiteside (13)
| Goran Dragic (5)
| AmericanAirlines Arena19,600
| 29–34
|- style= "background:#bfb;"
| 64
| March 6
| @ Cleveland
| 
| Dion Waiters (29)
| Hassan Whiteside (11)
| Goran Dragic (6)
| Quicken Loans Arena 20,562
| 30–34
|-style="background:#bfb;"
| 65
| March 8
| Charlotte
| 
| Dion Waiters (24)
| Hassan Whiteside (15)
| Goran Dragic (10)
| American Airlines Arena19,600
| 31–34
|- style="background:#bfb;"
| 66
| March 11
| Toronto
| 
| Dion Waiters (20)
| Hassan Whiteside (14)
| Dion Waiters (5)
| American Airlines Arena19,745
| 32–34
|- style="background:#fbb;"
| 67
| March 12
| @ Indiana
| 
| Hassan Whiteside (26)
| Hassan Whiteside (21)
| Dion Waiters (6)
| Bankers Life Fieldhouse17,923
| 32–35
|- style="background:#bfb;"
| 68
| March 15
| New Orleans
| 
| Goran Dragic (33)
| Hassan Whiteside (17)
| Tyler Johnson (9)
| American Airlines Arena19,678
| 33–35
|- style="background:#bfb;"
| 69
| March 17
| Minnesota
| 
| Whiteside, Johnson (23)
| Hassan Whiteside (14)
| Goran Dragic (10)
| American Airlines Arena19,600
| 34–35
|- style="background:#fbb;"
| 70
| March 19
| Portland
| 
| James Johnson (24)
| Hassan Whiteside (10)
| James Johnson (5)
| American Airlines Arena19,600
| 34–36
|- style="background:#bfb;"
| 71
| March 21
| Phoenix
| 
| Hassan Whiteside (23)
| Hassan Whiteside (14)
| Dragic, Johnson (4)
| American Airlines Arena19,600
| 35–36
|- style="background:#fbb;"
| 72
| March 23
| Toronto
| 
| Hassan Whiteside (16)
| Hassan Whiteside (14)
| Goran Dragic (7)
| American Airlines Arena19,745
| 35–37
|- style="background:#fbb;"
| 73
| March 26
| @ Boston
| 
| Tyler Johnson (24)
| Hassan Whiteside (15)
| James Johnson (6)
| TD Garden18,624
| 35–38
|- style="background:#bfb;"
| 74
| March 28
| @ Detroit
| 
| Goran Dragic (28)
| Hassan Whiteside (9)
| Dragic, McGruder, Richardson (4)
| The Palace of Auburn Hills17,160
| 36–38
|- style="background:#bfb;"
| 75
| March 29
| @ New York
| 
| Goran Dragic (20)
| Hassan Whiteside (9)
| Goran Dragic (9)
| Madison Square Garden19,812
| 37–38
|- style="background:#fbb;"
| 76
| March 31
| New York
| 
| Goran Dragic (22)
| Hassan Whiteside (16)
| Dragic, Richardson (5)
| AmericanAirlines Arena19,600
| 37–39

|- style="background:#fbb;"
| 77
| April 2
| Denver
| 
| Goran Dragic (22)
| Hassan Whiteside (12)
| Dragic, Johnson (6)
| AmericanAirlines Arena19,600
| 37–40
|- style="background:#bfb;"
| 78
| April 5
| @ Charlotte
| 
| Goran Dragic (33)
| Hassan Whiteside (20)
| Josh Richardson (5)
| Spectrum Center17,758
| 38–40
|- style="background:#fbb;"
| 79
| April 7
| @ Toronto
| 
| James Johnson (22)
| Whiteside, Johnson (10)
| Josh Richardson (4)
| Air Canada Centre19,800
| 38–41
|- style="background:#bfb;
| 80
| April 8
| @ Washington
| 
| Hassan Whiteside (30)
| Hassan Whiteside (12)
| Goran Dragic (7)
| Verizon Center20,365
| 39–41
|- style= "background:#bfb;"
| 81
| April 10
| Cleveland
| 
| Tyler Johnson (24)
| Hassan Whiteside (18)
| James Johnson (9)
| AmericanAirlines Arena19,673
| 40–41
|- style= "background:#bfb;"
| 82
| April 12
| Washington
| 
| Goran Dragic (28)
| Hassan Whiteside (18)
| James Johnson (8)
| AmericanAirlines Arena19,600
| 41–41

Transactions

Trades

Free agents

Re-signed

Additions

Subtractions

References

Miami Heat seasons
Miami Heat
Miami Heat
Miami Heat